Dugo ng Panday is a 1993 Filipino fantasy adventure film directed by Peque Gallaga and Lore Reyes. Based on the Pilipino Komiks character Panday, it is a spin-off and sequel to the original four Panday films starring Fernando Poe Jr. The film stars Ramon 'Bong' Revilla Jr., Edu Manzano, Leo Martinez, Max Alvarado, IC Mendoza, and Aiko Melendez. Produced by Regal Films, Dugo ng Panday was released in early January 1993.

Cast
Ramon 'Bong' Revilla Jr. as Flavio/Panday, a poor young descendant of the blacksmith with the same name (played by Fernando Poe Jr. in previous films)
Edu Manzano as Conde
Leo Martinez as Agno
Max Alvarado as Lizardo
IC Mendoza as Manrico
Aiko Melendez as Luna
Jaime Fabregas as the Gobernador
Max Laurel as Marag
Ram Mojica as Macaw
King Gutierrez as Nauhan
Edwin Reyes as Naga
Rey Solo as Magor
Romy Romulo as Conde's Lieutenant
Bien Garcia as Olan
Ramon Confiado as Jamal
Edison Magno as Dagim
Toto Perez as Bahaw
Jinky Laurel as Evil Duenna
Fame De Los Santos as Good Duenna
Bella Flores as Bantay
Koko Trinidad as a scientist
Peque Gallaga as a scientist
Don Escudero as a scientist
Dido de la Paz as a scientist

Production
Dugo ng Panday is Bong Revilla's first film under Regal Films.

Home media
On July 12, 2020, Regal Entertainment streamed the entirety of Dugo ng Panday free of charge through YouTube for a limited time.

References

External links

Panday
1993 films
1990s fantasy adventure films
Filipino-language films
Films based on Philippine comics
Films directed by Peque Gallaga
Live-action films based on comics
Philippine fantasy adventure films
Philippine films based on comics
Regal Entertainment films
Sword and sorcery films
Films directed by Lore Reyes